Banyo may refer to: 
 Banyo, Cameroon, a town and commune in Mbéré Department, Adamawa Province, Cameroon
 Banyo, Queensland, a suburb of Brisbane, Queensland, Australia 
Banyo railway station

See also
 Bagnio, a loan word into English with several meanings